General elections were held in the Solomon Islands on 26 May 1993. A record total of 280 candidates contested the election, the result of which was a landslide victory for the new SIGNUR party, which won 20 of the 47 seats. However, it failed to achieve a majority in Parliament, and its leader, Solomon Mamaloni, was defeated in the election for Prime Minister by Francis Billy Hilly.

Results

References

Solomon
General
Elections in the Solomon Islands
Solomon
Election and referendum articles with incomplete results